Jan Klaassens (4 September 1931 – 12 February 1983) was a Dutch football player who played for VVV-Venlo and Feyenoord, as well as the Netherlands national team.

References

1931 births
1983 deaths
Dutch footballers
Footballers from Venlo
VVV-Venlo players
Feyenoord players
Netherlands international footballers
Association football midfielders